In linear algebra, a minor of a matrix A is the determinant of some smaller square matrix, cut down from A by removing one or more of its rows and columns. Minors obtained by removing just one row and one column from square matrices (first minors) are required for calculating matrix cofactors, which in turn are useful for computing both the determinant and inverse of square matrices.  The requirement that the square matrix be smaller than the original matrix is often omitted in the definition.

Definition and illustration

First minors

If A is a square matrix, then the minor of the entry in the ith row and jth column (also called the (i, j) minor, or a first minor) is the determinant of the submatrix formed by deleting the ith row and jth column. This number is often denoted Mi,j.

To illustrate these definitions, consider the following 3 by 3 matrix,

To compute the minor M2,3 and the cofactor C2,3, we find the determinant of the above matrix with row 2 and column 3 removed.

So the cofactor of the (2,3) entry is

General definition

Let A be an m × n matrix and k an integer with 0 < k ≤ m, and k ≤ n. A k × k minor of A, also called minor determinant of order k of A or, if m = n, (n−k)th minor determinant of A (the word "determinant" is often omitted, and the word "degree" is sometimes used instead of "order") is the determinant of a k × k matrix obtained from A by deleting m−k rows and n−k columns. Sometimes the term is used to refer to the k × k matrix obtained from A as above (by deleting m−k rows and n−k columns), but this matrix should be referred to as a (square) submatrix of A, leaving the term "minor" to refer to the determinant of this matrix. For a matrix A as above, there are a total of  minors of size k × k. The minor of order zero is often defined to be 1. For a square matrix, the zeroth minor is just the determinant of the matrix.

Let  and  be ordered sequences (in natural order, as it is always assumed when talking about minors unless otherwise stated) of indexes, call them I and J, respectively. Also, there are two types of denotations in use in literature: by the minor associated to ordered sequences of indexes I and J, some authors mean the determinant of the matrix that is formed as above, by taking the elements of the original matrix from the rows whose indexes are in I and columns whose indexes are in J, whereas some other authors mean by a minor associated to I and J the determinant of the matrix formed from the original matrix by deleting the rows in I and columns in J. Which notation is used should always be checked from the source in question. In this article, we use the inclusive definition of choosing the elements from rows of I and columns of J. The exceptional case is the case of the first minor or the (i, j)-minor described above; in that case, the exclusive meaning  is standard everywhere in the literature and is used in this article also.

Complement

The complement, Bijk...,pqr..., of a minor, Mijk...,pqr..., of a square matrix, A, is formed by the determinant of the matrix A from which all the rows (ijk...) and columns (pqr...) associated with Mijk...,pqr... have been removed.  The complement of the first minor of an element aij is merely that element.

Applications of minors and cofactors

Cofactor expansion of the determinant

The cofactors feature prominently in Laplace's formula for the expansion of determinants, which is a method of computing larger determinants in terms of smaller ones. Given an  matrix , the determinant of A, denoted det(A), can be written as the sum of the cofactors of any row or column of the matrix multiplied by the entries that generated them. In other words, defining  then the cofactor expansion along the jth column gives:

The cofactor expansion along the ith row gives:

Inverse of a matrix

One can write down the inverse of an invertible matrix by computing its cofactors by using Cramer's rule, as follows. The matrix formed by all of the cofactors of a square matrix A is called the cofactor matrix (also called the matrix of cofactors or, sometimes, comatrix):

Then the inverse of A is the transpose of the cofactor matrix times the reciprocal of the determinant of A:

The transpose of the cofactor matrix is called the adjugate matrix (also called the classical adjoint) of A.

The above formula can be generalized as follows: Let  and  be ordered sequences (in natural order) of indexes (here A is an n × n matrix). Then

where I′, J′ denote the ordered sequences of indices (the indices are in natural order of magnitude, as above) complementary to I, J, so that every index 1, ..., n appears exactly once in either I or I′, but not in both (similarly for the  J and J′) and  denotes the determinant of the submatrix of A formed by choosing the rows of the index set I and columns of index set J. Also, . A simple proof can be given using wedge product. Indeed,

where  are the basis vectors. Acting by A on both sides, one gets

The sign can be worked out to be , so the sign is determined by the sums of elements in I and J.

Other applications
Given an m × n matrix with real entries (or entries from any other field) and rank r, then there exists at least one non-zero r × r minor, while all larger minors are zero.

We will use the following notation for minors: if A is an m × n matrix, I is a subset of {1,...,m} with k elements, and J is a subset of {1,...,n} with k elements, then we write [A]I,J for the  minor of A that corresponds to the rows with index in I and the columns with index in J.
 If I = J, then [A]I,J is called a principal minor.
 If the matrix that corresponds to a principal minor is a square upper-left submatrix of the larger matrix (i.e., it consists of matrix elements in rows and columns from 1 to k, also known as a leading principal submatrix), then the principal minor is called a leading principal minor (of order k) or corner (principal) minor (of order k). For an n × n square matrix, there are n leading principal minors.
 A basic minor of a matrix is the determinant of a square submatrix that is of maximal size with nonzero determinant.
 For Hermitian matrices, the leading principal minors can be used to test for positive definiteness and the principal minors can be used to test for positive semidefiniteness. See Sylvester's criterion for more details.

Both the formula for ordinary matrix multiplication and the Cauchy–Binet formula for the determinant of the product of two matrices are special cases of the following general statement about the minors of a product of two matrices.
Suppose that A is an m × n matrix, B is an n × p matrix, I is a subset of {1,...,m} with k elements and J is a subset of {1,...,p} with k elements. Then

where the sum extends over all subsets K of {1,...,n} with k elements. This formula is a straightforward extension of the Cauchy–Binet formula.

Multilinear algebra approach

A more systematic, algebraic treatment of minors is given in multilinear algebra, using the wedge product: the k-minors of a matrix are the entries in the kth exterior power map.

If the columns of a matrix are wedged together k at a time, the k × k minors appear as the components of the resulting k-vectors. For example, the 2 × 2 minors of the matrix

are −13 (from the first two rows), −7 (from the first and last row), and 5 (from the last two rows). Now consider the wedge product

where the two expressions correspond to the two columns of our matrix. Using the properties of the wedge product, namely that it is bilinear and alternating,

and antisymmetric,

we can simplify this expression to

where the coefficients agree with the minors computed earlier.

A remark about different notation
In some books, instead of cofactor the term adjunct is used. Moreover, it is denoted as Aij and defined in the same way as cofactor:

Using this notation the inverse matrix is written this way:

Keep in mind that adjunct is not adjugate or adjoint. In modern terminology, the "adjoint" of a matrix most often refers to the corresponding  adjoint operator.

See also
 Submatrix

References

External links
 MIT Linear Algebra Lecture on Cofactors at Google Video, from MIT OpenCourseWare
 PlanetMath entry of Cofactors
 Springer Encyclopedia of Mathematics entry for Minor

Matrix theory
Determinants